Wassell is a surname. Notable people with the surname include:

Alan Wassell (born 1940), English cricketer
Albert Wassell (1892-1975), English cricketer
Corydon M. Wassell (1884-1958), United States Army physician
Harold Wassell (1879–1951), English footballer
Herbert Wassell Nadal (1873-1957), American minstrel show performer
Kim Wassell (born 1957), English footballer 
Richard Wassell (1880-1949), English composer and organist